Mount Asgard (Sivanitirutinguak) is a twin peaked mountain with two flat-topped, cylindrical, rock towers, separated by a saddle. It is located in Auyuittuq National Park, on the Cumberland Peninsula of Baffin Island, Nunavut, Canada. The peak is named after Asgard, the realm of the Æsir (gods) in Norse mythology. Mount Asgard is perhaps the most famous of the Baffin Mountains.

Climbing history

Asgard's slightly higher North Peak was first ascended in 1953 by J. Weber, J. Marmet, and Hans Röthlisberger, Swiss scientists on the Baffin Island Expedition of the Arctic Institute of North America, led by the Canadian, P. Baird. Their route ascended the east side of the north peak, using a climbing traverse across snowfields and rock ribs, to reach the saddle between the two peaks, and thence to the top of the North Peak. The route is graded VI, 5.8/5.9 A1. It is still the most-travelled route and is the standard descent route for climbers making more difficult ascents on other faces.

The South Peak was first climbed in 1971 by G. Lee, R. Wood, P. Clanky, J. Pavur, Y. Kamisawa and P. Koch. One of the most notable routes was put up in 1975 by Charlie Porter as a solo climb. This was "the first Baffin modern, multi-day, technical, big-wall climb", with 40 pitches rated at Grade VII, 5.10, A4 and it was followed by "a 10-day walk-out to the fjord-head without food". The fact that this was all done solo was "a remarkable achievement".

In film
In 1976, Rick Sylvester, a stuntman and climber, performed a BASE jump, skiing off the mountain with a Union Jack parachute for the pre-title sequence of the James Bond film The Spy Who Loved Me although the setting was the Alps. The stunt team and film crew had reached the summit by helicopter.

See also 
 List of mountains of Canada

References

External links

Arctic Cordillera
Mountains of Baffin Island
Protected areas of Nunavut
Two-thousanders of Nunavut